In Myanmar's next general election, voters will elect representatives to both the Amyotha Hluttaw and the Pyithu Hluttaw of the Assembly of the Union. The election will be the first after the 2021 military coup d'état. Though the military initially promised to hold the election by August 2023, it has since indefinitely delayed the election in the face of increasing violence.

Since the coup, the military has ruled the country under a state of emergency, initially declared by Acting President Myint Swe for one year and extended three times by six month periods, currently set to expire on 1 August 2023. The constitution requires elections be held within six months of the end of the state of emergency. The military is expected to seek legitimacy for its extended rule through the election, which is unlikely to be free and fair. 

In January 2023, the military enacted a new electoral law switching from a majoritatian to a proportional system, in what appear to be an attempt to lessen the electoral consequences of the lack of popularity of the military proxy Union Solidarity and Development Party, which performed poorly in the free and fair 2020 election. Added to the previously existing 25% reserved seats to the military, the switch would allow it to govern with barely one fourth of the popular vote. 

The National League for Democracy, which was removed from power in the coup, announced in February 2023 that it would not register under the new law. The second-largest opposition party, the Shan Nationalities League for Democracy, decried the new electoral law but said it may still register.

Background
Myanmar, previously known as Burma, has been under a dictatorship for the majority of its independent history. First, under Ne Win and his Burma Socialist Programme Party, and then under a military junta. In the early 2010s, Myanmar transitioned into a state of semi-democracy, finally culminating in the 2015 elections, where democracy leader Aung San Suu Kyi became State Counsellor, and her party the National League for Democracy won a landslide victory.

Coup
In the 2020 general elections the NLD won another landslide over the Tatmadaw (military) backed Union Solidarity and Development Party. The military claimed the vote was fraudulent, and on 1 February 2021, launched a coup. Suu Kyi was detained, along with President Win Myint. Senior General Min Aung Hlaing took power, organizing a junta called the State Administration Council. Myint Swe was declared interim President, and a state of emergency was declared for one year. Aung San Suu Kyi received a number of frivolous charges, including breaching emergency COVID-19 laws and for illegally importing and using radio and communication devices, specifically six ICOM devices from her security team and a walkie-talkie, which are restricted in Myanmar and need clearance from military-related agencies before acquisition. She and Myint were both remanded in custody for two weeks. Aung San Suu Kyi received an additional criminal charge for violating the National Disaster Act on 16 February, two additional charges for violating communications laws and an intent to incite public unrest on 1 March and another for violating the official secrets act on 1 April. On 6 December 2021, she was sentenced to four years in prison, but Hlaing commuted her sentence to two years. Her conviction complicates her ability to hold public office.

On 1 August 2021, Hlaing formed a caretaker government, and declared himself Prime Minister. He still holds the office of Chairman of the SAC.

The Tatmadaw originally promised to hold the elections when the state of emergency expires on 1 February 2022, but they were later pushed back to 2023.

The junta has never released evidence to back up their claims of voter fraud.

Proposed dissolution of the NLD
On 21 May 2021, the junta's Union Election Committee announced plans to permanently dissolve the National League for Democracy. NLD offices were occupied and raided by police authorities, starting on 2 February. Documents, computers and laptops were forcibly seized, and the NLD called these raids unlawful. On 9 February, police raided the NLD headquarters in Yangon. Aung San Suu Kyi has commented on the  possibility of her party's forced dissolution saying, "Our party grew out of the people so it will exist as long as people support it."

In January 2022, the junta reversed its plan to dissolve the NLD, with spokesman Zaw Min Tun saying that the NLD will decide whether to stand in the 2023 election. In February 2023, the NLD announced it would not re-register as a political party under a strict new electoral law enacted by the junta the previous month.

Electoral system

Previously, Myanmar has exclusively used the first-past-the-post system, in which a candidate needs only a plurality of votes in a constituency to be elected. But, for the next election, Khin Maung Oo, a member of the Union Election Commission, said at a press conference in Naypyidaw on 16 June 2022 that the country will use a proportional representation system instead.

The Pyithu Hluttaw, or House of Representatives, is elected every five years. It is the lower house. It has 440 MPs, 330 of which are elected in single-member constituencies, one for each township. A further 110 members (one quarter) are appointed by the Tatmadaw.

The Amyotha Hluttaw, or House of Nationalities, is elected every five years. It is the upper house. It has 224 MPs, 168 of which are elected in single-member constituencies, 12 in each state or region. A further 56 members (one quarter) are appointed by the Tatmadaw.

In Myanmar, it is not uncommon for elections to be cancelled partially or completely in some constituencies due to insurrection.

After the new legislators take office, the President and the two Vice Presidents of Myanmar are elected by the Presidential Electoral College, made up of MPs from three committees: one of elected members from each house of the Assembly of the Union, and one from the military-appointed members. Each committee recommends one candidate, and the Assembly then holds a vote. The position the candidates are elected to depends on their overall vote total (the highest vote-getter becomes President, while the second-highest becomes First Vice President, and the remaining candidate becomes Second Vice President). 

People married to a non-Burmese citizen and/or who have children without Burmese citizenship are barred from being elected to any presidential position. This requirement has been criticized by some as being an attempt to disqualify Suu Kyi. Her late husband was a British citizen, so she was ineligible to be President. Instead, she became State Counsellor, and President Win Myint was seen as her puppet.

In December 2021, the Union Electoral Commission held a series of talks with over 60 political parties on the electoral system. They determined that it would be advisable to switch to a system of party-list proportional representation. The largest remainder method will be used, and the lists will be closed, although there may be a switch to open lists "when the level of education of the electorate and the political tide rises". The townships will be merged into districts for constituencies. 

The change in electoral system was criticized by many anti-junta factions being politically motivated. The argument is that the NLD received an over-representative share of the seats in the 2015 election, and therefore they could receive less seats under proportional representation. Statistics for the popular vote do not appear to be available for the 2020 elections.

Conduct
Although the past three elections in Myanmar have been semi-free, there have been concerns over such things as irregularities in voter lists, misinformation, fake news, and the vilification of Burmese Muslims. In addition, the military is effectively guaranteed one vice presidency, and a quarter of the seats in both chambers of the Pyidaungsu Hluttaw, as well as a third of the seats in all state and regional Hluttaws, and some ministries. 

Some members of the NLD dominated Pyidaungsu Hluttaw elected in 2020 have formed an anti-cabinet known as the National Unity Government of Myanmar. The NUG claims to be the legitimate government of Myanmar, and the junta and the NUG consider each other terrorist groups. The NUG is backed by the People's Defence Force, a paramilitary group that has engaged in an internal conflict with the Tatmadaw since the coup, that has resulted in the deaths of hundreds of Tatmadaw soldiers in what effectively amounts to a civil war. This, along with ongoing ethnic conflicts, means the vote will likely be cancelled in some constituencies, and may not be secure in others.

In addition, some have expressed concerns about the Tatmadaw's willingness to hold free and fair elections.

Political parties

The table below lists the parties that managed to elect representatives to the Pyidaungsu Hluttaw in 2020, except the National League for Democracy, which won a majority in 2020 and is boycotting the next election. Most parties in Myanmar represent one of the country's many ethnic minorities.

References

Elections in Myanmar
Myanmar